Schmidt Peninsula is a peninsula in Sakhalin Oblast, Russian Federation. It is the northernmost point of Sakhalin Island and is located north of Okha town.

History
The indigenous Nivkh people of northern Sakhalin called the peninsula Mif-Tyongr (Миф-тёнгр), meaning "head of the earth." 
The name Schmidt Peninsula was chosen by geologist N. Tikhonovich in 1908, in honor of fellow geologist Fyodor Schmidt who had visited Sakhalin in 1866. Previously it had been named "Saint Elizabeth Peninsula" in certain maps. Cape Elizabeth and Cape Mary, the two main headlands of the peninsula, had been named in 1805 by Russian Navy Admiral Ivan Kruzenshtern (1770–1846).

Geography 
The Schmidt Peninsula is the northern extremity of Sakhalin Island. There are two roughly parallel mountain ranges stretching in a NNW/SSE direction. The mountains are covered with larch and spruce forests and are separated by a swampy valley. Cape Elizabeth is at the northern end of the Eastern Range and Cape Mary (мыс Марии), the northwestern headland, at the northern end of the lower Western Range. Severny Bay lies between them. To the west lies the Sakhalin Gulf and to the east and north the Sea of Okhotsk.

References

External links
 

Peninsulas of Russia
Landforms of Sakhalin Oblast